Joakim Nyström and Mats Wilander were the defending champions, but lost in the second round to Carl Limberger and Mark Woodforde.

Ken Flach and Robert Seguso defeated Sergio Casal and Emilio Sánchez in the final, 3–6, 6–7(6–8), 7–6(7–3), 6–1, 6–4 to win the gentlemen's doubles title at the 1987 Wimbledon Championships.

Stefan Edberg and Anders Järryd's semi-final loss to Casal and Sanchez was Järryd's only Grand Slam loss of 1989, as he won the Australian Open and US Open with Edberg and the French Open with Seguso.

Seeds

  Guy Forget /  Yannick Noah (quarterfinals)
  Paul Annacone /  Christo van Rensburg (quarterfinals)
  Andrés Gómez /  Slobodan Živojinović (semifinals)
  Stefan Edberg /  Anders Järryd (semifinals)
  Joakim Nyström /  Mats Wilander (second round)
  Gary Donnelly /  Peter Fleming (second round)
  Ken Flach /  Robert Seguso (champions)
  Sergio Casal /  Emilio Sánchez (final)
  Chip Hooper /  Mike Leach (third round)
  Kevin Curren /  Mike De Palmer (first round)
  Christo Steyn /  Danie Visser (first round)
  Peter Doohan /  Laurie Warder (third round)
  Sherwood Stewart /  Kim Warwick (first round)
  Andy Kohlberg /  Robert Van't Hof (third round)
  Scott Davis /  David Pate (third round)
  John Fitzgerald /  Tomáš Šmíd (first round)

Qualifying

Draw

Finals

Top half

Section 1

Section 2

Bottom half

Section 3

Section 4

References

External links

1987 Wimbledon Championships – Men's draws and results at the International Tennis Federation

Men's Doubles
Wimbledon Championship by year – Men's doubles